Hypsi or Hypsoi was a settlement in ancient Laconia, containing temples of Asclepius and Artemis Daphnaea, situated 30 stadia from the Carneium on Mount Cnacadium.

Its site is unlocated, but was near Las.

References

Populated places in ancient Laconia
Former populated places in Greece
Lost ancient cities and towns